, established in 1936, is a Japanese manufacturing company.

References

Manufacturing companies of Japan